Buckland is a parish municipality of about 800 people in the Bellechasse Regional County Municipality, in the Chaudière-Appalaches region of Quebec, Canada. Although the official name is Notre-Dame-Auxiliatrice-de-Buckland, almost everyone refers to it as simply Buckland.

Demographics 

References

Parish municipalities in Quebec
Incorporated places in Chaudière-Appalaches